1010 Midtown is a 35-story,  skyscraper in Atlanta, Georgia with 425 condominiums atop  of retail and dining space. The 1010 Midtown building also features a park-in-the-sky, which will be one of the largest environmentally green rooftops in the city.

Daniel Corporation, Selig Enterprises, the Canyon-Johnson Urban Fund (CJUF), and MetLife combined forces to make 1010 Midtown, a key piece in the Midtown Mile, a reality. The building was designed by the architecture firm Rule Joy Trammell + Rubio and built by Brasfield & Gorrie. Construction of this first phase of the 12th & Midtown development began in August 2006 and was completed in early 2009.

At the base of 1010 Midtown sit several restaurants, including Sugar Factory and Silverlake Ramen. It also houses a Bank of America branch and additional retail space fronting Peachtree Street.

Incident
On March 9, 2012, a man jumped to his death from the 35th floor of the building.

Midtown Mile 
The Midtown Mile, a block that is expected to cover some  when completed, will run along Peachtree Street and will be the newest location for high-end retail and dining activities in Atlanta. It will host a variety of flagship storefronts, restaurants, hotels and high-rises, of which, 1010 Midtown will be the first to be fully completed.

References

External links
 1010 Midtown official website
 1010 Midtown official blog

Residential skyscrapers in Atlanta
Midtown Atlanta
Residential condominiums in the United States
Residential buildings completed in 2009